Bulmershe may refer to:

 Bulmershe College
 Bulmershe Court
The Bulmershe School

See also 
 University of Reading